The Cradle Buster is a 1922 American silent comedy film directed by Frank Tuttle and starring Glenn Hunter, Marguerite Courtot and William H. Tooker.

Cast
Glenn Hunter as Benjamin Franklin Reed
Marguerite Courtot as Gay Dixon
Mary Foy as Melia Prout
William H. Tooker as 'Blarney' Dixon
Lois Blaine as Polly Ann Parsons
Osgood Perkins as Crack 'Spoony'
Townsend Martin as Holcomb Berry
Beatrice Burton Morgan as 	Mrs. Reed

References

Bibliography

External links

1922 comedy films
1920s English-language films
American silent feature films
Silent American comedy films
American black-and-white films
Films directed by Frank Tuttle
1920s American films